Brit Awards 2011  was the 31st edition of the British Phonographic Industry's annual pop music show, the Brit Awards. The awards ceremony was held on Tuesday 15 March 2011
at The O2 Arena in London for the first time in its history, moving from the original venue of Earls Court, also in London. The ceremony was hosted by James Corden. Leading the nominations was Tinie Tempah with four nominations. The artists with the most awards won were Tinie Tempah and Arcade Fire, with two wins each. The 2011 awards were billed as a reboot of the Brit Awards format featuring a different venue, a new award statuette designed by Vivienne Westwood and a greater emphasis placed on music, particularly live performances. Whilst the re-working of the show was generally well received, the TV audience was the lowest for five years, with an average viewership of 4.8 million viewers peaking at 5.9 million.

Performances

Winners and nominees

Multiple nominations and awards

Moments

Adele's performance of "Someone Like You"
Adele performed her song "Someone Like You" at the ceremony with only a piano accompanying her. Her emotional performance was received with a standing ovation at the O2 Arena and the video received millions of hits on YouTube within days. The performance launched "Someone Like You" 46 spots up the UK charts to number one, and in the process, made Adele the first artist in the UK since The Beatles to have two top-five singles and two top-five albums at the same time.

James Corden, Justin Bieber, and Plan B
James Corden made jokes throughout the ceremony which drew criticism on social networking site Twitter. A targeted example was talking to acts in between awards when he came across Justin Bieber. In his trademark humour, Corden said to Bieber "You smell amazing! How old are you?". A bemused Bieber replied "thanks". Similarly, after Plan B's performance of his hit "Prayin' finished with a man on fire, Corden described it as a really violent episode of Porridge and remarked "is Justin Bieber OK? The amount of hair products that boy uses. He could have gone up in flames." As the man on fire took to the stage during Plan B's performance, some of the crowd showed their disapproval and booed.

Notes
A  These were released on iTunes as live performances

References

External links
Brit Awards 2011 at Brits.co.uk

Brit Awards
Brit Awards
Brit Awards
Brit Awards
Brit
Brit Awards